The 33rd Air Division (33d AD) is an inactive United States Air Force organization.  Its last assignment was with Air Defense Command, assigned to First Air Force, being stationed at Fort Lee Air Force Station, Virginia.  It was inactivated on 19 November 1969.

History

The 33d Air Division had air defense responsibility for an area encompassing Oklahoma, Arkansas, Texas, Louisiana, and parts of Kansas, Missouri, and Mississippi in March 1951.  It was inactivated in June 1961.

Activated again in 1966, replacing the Washington Air Defense Sector with its area changed to cover parts of North Carolina, South Carolina, and Virginia.  Assumed additional designation of 33d NORAD Region after activation of the NORAD Combat Operations Center at the Cheyenne Mountain Complex, Colorado and reporting was transferred to NORAD from ADC at Ent Air Force Base in April 1966. The division supervised, administered, and trained its assigned units and, in doing so, participated in numerous live and simulated exercises.

Lineage
 Established as the 33 Air Division (Defense) on 5 March 1951
 Activated on 19 March 1951
 Inactivated on 1 February 1952
 Organized on 1 February 1952
 Redesignated 33 Air Division (SAGE) on 1 January 1960
 Discontinued, and inactivated, on 1 July 1961
 Redesignated 33 Air Division and activated on 20 January 1966 (not organized)
 Organized on 1 April 1966
 Inactivated on 19 November 1969

Assignments
 Air Defense Command
 Eastern Air Defense Force 19 March – 20 May 1951
 Central Air Defense Force, 20 May 1951 – 1 January 1960
 Air Defense Command, 1 January 1960 – 1 July 1961
 Air Defense Command, 20 January 1966 (not organized)
 First Air Force, 1 April 1966 – 19 November 1969

Stations
 Tinker Air Force Base, Oklahoma 19 March 1951 – 8 May 1956
 Oklahoma City Air Force Station, Oklahoma, 8 May 1956
 Richards-Gebaur Air Force Base, Missouri, 1 January 1960 – 1 July 1961
 Fort Lee Air Force Station, Virginia 19 April 1966 – 19 November 1969

Components

Sectors

 Albuquerque Air Defense Sector: 1 January – 1 November 1960
 Kirtland Air Force Base, New Mexico
 Kansas City Air Defense Sector: 1 January 1960 – 1 July 1961
 Richards-Gebaur Air Force Base, Missouri

 Oklahoma City Air Defense Sector: 1 January 1960 – 1 July 1961
 Oklahoma City Air Force Base, Oklahoma
 Sioux City Air Defense Sector: 1 January 1960 – 1 July 1961
 Sioux City Municipal Airport, Iowa

Groups
 328th Fighter Group: 18 August 1955 – 1 March 1956
 Richards-Gebaur Air Force Base, Missouri
 546th Aircraft Control and Warning Group
 Tinker Air Force Base, Oklahoma, 19 March-4 June 1951
 4676th Air Defense Group: 2 March 1954 – 18 August 1955
 Richards-Gebaur Air Force Base, Missouri

Interceptor squadrons

 48th Fighter-Interceptor Squadron: 1 April 1966 – 19 November 1969
 Langley Air Force Base, Virginia
 85th Fighter-Interceptor Squadron: 1 November 1952 – 1 March 1956
 Scott Air Force Base, Illinois
 95th Fighter-Interceptor Squadron: 1 December 1967 – 19 November 1969
 Dover Air Force Base, Delaware
 113th Fighter-Interceptor Squadron: 1 April – 1 November 1952
 Scott Air Force Base, Illinois

 326th Fighter-Interceptor Squadron: 18 December 1953 – 2 March 1954
 Fairfax Field, Kansas
 331st Fighter-Interceptor Squadron: 15 August 1958 – 1 January 1960
 Webb Air Force Base, Texas
 332d Fighter-Interceptor Squadron: 10 July 1959 – 1 January 1960
 England Air Force Base, Louisiana
 444th Fighter-Interceptor Squadron: 1 April 1966 – 30 September 1968
 Charleston Air Force Base, South Carolina

Missile squadrons
 22d Air Defense Missile Squadron (BOMARC): 1 April 1966 – 19 November 1969
 Langley Air Force Base, Virginia

Radar squadrons

 632d Radar Squadron
 Roanoke Rapids Air Force Station, North Carolina, 1 April 1966 – 19 November 1969
 644th Radar Squadron
 Richmond Air Force Station, Florida, 14–19 November 1969
 645th Radar Squadron
 Patrick Air Force Base, Florida, 14–19 November 1969
 649th Radar Squadron
 Bedford Air Force Station, Virginia, 1 April 1966 – 19 November 1969
 657th Radar Squadron
 Houma Air Force Station, Louisiana, 14–19 November 1969
 662d Radar Squadron
 Oakdale Air Force Station, Pennsylvania, 16 September-31 December 1969
 671st Radar Squadron
 Key West Naval Air Station, Florida, 14–19 November 1969
 678th Radar Squadron
 Tyndall Air Force Base, Florida, 14–19 November 1969
 679th Radar Squadron
 Jacksonville Naval Air Station, Florida, 14–19 November 1969
 680th Radar Squadron
 Palermo Air Force Station, New Jersey, 1 April 1968 – 19 November 1969
 693d Radar Squadron
 Dauphin Island Air Force Station, Alabama, 14–19 November 1969

 701st Radar Squadron
 Fort Fisher Air Force Station, North Carolina, 1 April 1966 – 19 November 1969
 702d Radar Squadron
 Hunter Air Force Base, Georgia, 14–19 November 1969
 725th Aircraft Control and Warning Squadron
 Walnut Ridge Air Force Station, Arkansas, 8 April 1955 – 1 March 1956
 738th Aircraft Control and Warning Squadron
 Olathe Air Force Station, Kansas, 1 February 1953 – 1 March 1956
 770th Radar Squadron
 Fort George G. Meade, Maryland, 1 April 1966 – 19 November 1969
 790th Aircraft Control and Warning Squadron
 Kirksville Air Force Station, Missouri, 6 February 1952 – 1 March 1956
 792d Radar Squadron
 North Charleston Air Force Station, South Carolina, 1 April 1966 – 19 November 1969
 793d Aircraft Control and Warning Squadron
 Hutchinson Air Force Station, Kansas, 6 February 1952 – 1 March 1956
 810th Radar Squadron
 Winston-Salem Air Force Station, North Carolina, 1 April 1966 – 19 November 1969
 861st Radar Squadron
 Aiken Air Force Station, South Carolina, 14–19 November 1969

See also
 List of United States Air Force Aerospace Defense Command Interceptor Squadrons
 List of United States Air Force air divisions
 United States general surveillance radar stations

References

Notes

Bibliography

 
 
 "ADCOM's Fighter Interceptor Squadrons". The Interceptor (January 1979) Aerospace Defense Command, (Volume 21, Number 1)

Aerospace Defense Command units
033
1951 establishments in Oklahoma
1961 disestablishments in Missouri
1966 establishments in Virginia
1969 disestablishments in Virginia